Everything for Sale is a 1921 American silent drama film directed by Frank O'Connor and written by Hector Turnbull. The film stars May McAvoy, A. Edward Sutherland, Kathlyn Williams, Edwin Stevens, Richard Tucker, and Betty Schade. The film was released on September 25, 1921, by Paramount Pictures. It is not known if it survives, which suggests that it is a lost film.

Cast
May McAvoy as Helen Wainwright
A. Edward Sutherland as Donald Scott 
Kathlyn Williams as Mrs. Wainwright
 Edwin Stevens as Mr. Wainwright
Richard Tucker as Lee Morton
Betty Schade as Lillian Lord
Dana Todd as Billy Mitchell
Jane Keckley as Sarah Calmm

References

External links

1921 films
1920s English-language films
Silent American drama films
1921 drama films
Paramount Pictures films
American black-and-white films
American silent feature films
Films directed by Frank O'Connor
1920s American films